Dimitar of Kratovo was a 15th-century Slavic  writer and lexicographer, and one of the most important members of the  during the Ottoman Empire.

Biography 
We know next to nothing about his life. In all probability he was a priest or, even more likely, a monk. Dimitar was active in mid-15th century at the time when his town, Kratovo was in the hands of Ottomans for more than half a century. However, ore rich vicinity of the town and the wealth that stemmed from this source made it an important center for various arts, not least literature.

In 1466 the Archbishop of Ohrid, Dorotheus, was searching for a learned men to translate the Syntagma of Matthew Blastares from Greek into Serbian because his cathedral seat did not have that book in the language that would be understood by natives. When he visited Kratovo he met Dimitar and appointed him to do this.

When Dimitar started the translation he noted the whole story saying that he began to translate the "Law Book" for Archbishop Dorotheus of Ohrid “from Greek language into Serbian” (v eže sastaviti mi pisaniem srbskoga jezika sočinenie, rekše knigu imenuemu zakonik) since the Cathedral Church in Ohrid did not have that book “in Serbian” (po jeziku srbskom) but only in Greek.

Work 
After translating the Syntagma, Dimitar continued and in its nine pages (out of ten that survived) he noted down a list of metropolitans and archbishops under the jurisdiction of the Patriarch of Constantinople. He continued with a brief Latin–Slavic dictionary of only sixty-seven words. This is followed by his “Epilogue” — an original literary text — in which Dimitar told the story of how the book came to be translated and gives us his thoughts on life, morals, religion, Church and society of his day and age. In the end the author left transcripts of two letters exchanged in 1456 between Archbishop Dorotheus and Moldavian duke Stephen the Great.

See also
 Saint Sava who is remembered as the father of Serbian medieval literature
 Teodosije the Hilandarian (1246-1328), one of the most important Serbian writers in the Middle Ages
 Elder Grigorije (fl. 1310-1355), builder of Saint Archangels Monastery
 Antonije Bagaš (fl. 1356-1366), bought and restored the Agiou Pavlou monastery
 Lazar the Hilandarian (fl. 1404), the first known Serbian and Russian watchmaker
 Pachomius the Serb (fl. the 1440s-1484), hagiographer of the Russian Church
 Miroslav Gospel
 Gabriel the Hilandarian
 Constantine of Kostenets
 Cyprian, Metropolitan of Kyiv and All Rus'
 Gregory Tsamblak
 Isaija the Monk
 Grigorije of Gornjak
 Rajčin Sudić
 Jakov of Serres
 Romylos of Vidin
 Jovan the Serb of Kratovo
 Nicodemus of Tismana
 Anonymous Athonite
 Grigorije Vasilije
 Kalist Rasoder

References 

Hrvatska enciklopedija
Vladimir Kačanovski, Starine 12, 1880, p. 255
Kosta Kostić, Naši novi gradovi na jugu, Belgrade 1922

15th-century Serbian writers
Lexicographers
Translators from Greek
Translators to Serbian
People from Kratovo, North Macedonia
Serbs of North Macedonia
Medieval Serbian Orthodox clergy
Medieval European scribes